Chapter 9, Title 11, United States Code is a chapter of the United States Bankruptcy Code, available exclusively to municipalities and  assisting them in the restructuring of their debt.  On July 18, 2013, Detroit, Michigan became the largest city in the history of the United States to file for Chapter 9 bankruptcy protection. Jefferson County, Alabama, in 2011, and Orange County, California, in 1994, are also notable examples. The term 'municipality' denotes "a  political subdivision or public agency or instrumentality of a State," but does not include a state itself. States are therefore unable to file for bankruptcy, even though they have defaulted in their obligations.

History

The first municipal bankruptcy legislation was enacted in 1934 during the Great Depression. Although Congress attempted to draft the legislation so as not to interfere with the sovereign powers of the states guaranteed by the Tenth Amendment to the Constitution, the Supreme Court held the 1934 Act unconstitutional as an improper interference with the sovereignty of the states. Congress enacted a revised Municipal Bankruptcy Act in 1937, which was upheld by the Supreme Court. The law has been amended several times since 1937.

From 1937 to 2008 there were fewer than 600 municipal bankruptcies. As of June 2012 the total was around 640. In 2012 there were twelve chapter 9 bankruptcies in the United States, and five petitions have been filed in 2013. Since 2010, 61 petitions have been filed.

Previous to the creation of Chapter 9 bankruptcy, the only remedy when a municipality was unable to pay its creditors was for the creditors to pursue an action of mandamus, and compel the municipality to raise taxes. During the Great Depression, this approach proved impossible, so in 1934, the Bankruptcy Act was amended to extend to municipalities. The 1934 Amendment was declared unconstitutional in Ashton v. Cameron County Water District.

However, a revised  act remedying the constitutional deficiencies was passed again by Congress in 1937 and codified as Chapter X of the Bankruptcy Act (later redesignated as Chapter IX). This revised act was upheld as constitutional by the Supreme Court in United States v. Bekins.

Chapter 9 was largely unchanged until it was amended in 1976 in response to New York City's financial crisis. The changes made in 1976 were adopted nearly identically in the modern 1978 Bankruptcy Code as Chapter 9.

In 1988, Chapter 9 was amended by Congress to provide statutory protection from § 552(a) lien stripping provisions to revenue bonds issued by municipalities. This was addressed with the classification of these bonds as "special revenues" under the newly minted § 928(a) and § 922(d) exemption of special revenues from the automatic stay provisions of § 362.

To prevent overlap with Chapter 11, § 101(41) of the U.S. Bankruptcy Code (11 U.S.C. § 101(41)) defines the term "person" to exclude many "governmental units" as defined in § 101(27), and "municipality" as defined in § 101(40).

Features of Chapter 9

While in many ways similar to other forms of bankruptcy reorganization (esp. Chapter 11), Chapter 9 has a number of unique characteristics. Because municipalities are entities of State governments, the power of the bankruptcy court is limited to some extent by the Tenth Amendment to the United States Constitution.

Collective bargaining
Municipalities' ability to re-write collective bargaining agreements is much greater than in a corporate Chapter 11 bankruptcy and can trump state labor protections, allowing cities to renegotiate unsustainable pension or other benefits packages negotiated in flush times.

Authorization for filing of municipal bankruptcies 

Section 109(c) of the U.S. Bankruptcy Code provides that a municipality may be a debtor in a Chapter 9 bankruptcy case only if the municipality is specifically authorized to be a debtor by State law, or by a governmental officer or organization empowered by State law to authorize the municipality to be a debtor. In 23 states, Chapter 9 authorization laws are either unclear or otherwise prohibited for municipalities. Three states (Colorado, Illinois and Oregon) grant a very limited authorization to file for bankruptcy. Illinois, for example, only grants Chapter 9 authorization to the Illinois Power Agency.  

A total of 12 states authorize Chapter 9 upon conditions met and further action of state, officials or other entity; and the remainder (12) specifically authorize bankruptcy.

Inclusion of states in Chapter 9 

Neither Chapter 9 nor any other part of U.S. bankruptcy law allows a state to file for bankruptcy, although states have defaulted on their obligations. The last U.S. state default took place in 1933, when Arkansas defaulted on its bonds.

Certain politicians and scholars have argued that the law should be amended to allow states to file for bankruptcy. Proponents say that an orderly bankruptcy is a better solution than the two alternatives: (1) defaults, which are violations of debt obligations outside of the bankruptcy process), and (2) bailouts by the federal government. Opponents, including representatives of the National Governors Association, say that amending the law to allow states to seek bankruptcy protection could create doubts in the municipal bond market.

Notable Chapter 9 bankruptcies

Note: Population refers to the population served at the time of the bankruptcy and may not be the same as its current population. Dollar values are as reported at the time and do not reflect current value.

===Notable defaults that did not result in Chapter 9 bankruptcy===
Cleveland, Ohio, 1978, dispute with city creditors over sale of a utility.

See also
 Community Act 47, Financially Distressed Municipalities Act, Commonwealth of Pennsylvania.
Super Chapter 9

References

External links
 GASB Accounting and Financial Reporting for Chapter 9 Bankruptcies
 Number of Ch. 9 filings by year data from the American Bankruptcy Institute
 Ohio Local Government Fiscal Emergency/Fiscal Watch Law Fact Sheet
 Municipal Bankruptcy in Perspective, A Joint Publication of PAR and BGR
 Michigan Public Act 72 of 1990, Local Government Fiscal Responsibility Act, and the Appointment of Emergency Financial Managers
 Chapter 9, Title 11, United States Code at the Cornell University Law School Legal Information Institute
 Municipal Bankruptcy in Alabama - Kerem Deal
 AN EXAMINATION OF MUNICIPAL FINANCE REFORM REGARDING MUNICIPAL BANKRUPTCIES IN THE UNITED STATES  - Kerem Deal
 Administrative Office of the U.S. Courts Bankruptcy Basics -- Municipality Bankruptcy

 
Title 11 of the United States Code
United States bankruptcy legislation
Municipalities in the United States